Jeongeup, also known as Jeongeup-si, is a city in North Jeolla Province, South Korea. The city limits include Naejang-san National Park, a popular destination particularly in autumn due to its foliage.  Jeongeup is on the Honam Expressway and Honam Line, with the Seohaean Expressway also within easy reach, providing links to Seoul and Mokpo.

Demographics
Jeongeup's population is in decline, with an average of 56 people moving to the city every day but 91 leaving, with the birth and death rates being equal. The divorce rate currently runs at 50%.

Geography
The main hills in Jeongeup are Naejang-san National Park and Ibamsan, though there are also several smaller hills in the city. It is the east of the city which is more mountainous, the west being a plain around the Dongjin River.  There are several streams in Jeongeup, most notably the Jeongeupcheon, a tributary of the Dongjin. This over went a makeover by the city council in December 2009.

Attractions
Jeongeup, like many cities in Korea, had a hyanggyo, or Confucian school, where people were trained in Confucian ways. This building is a tourist attraction today, but is not open to the public.

Jeongeup is known for a traditional song from the Baekje Kingdom era, known as Jeongeup-ga. The song tells the tale of the lamenting heart of a woman waiting for her peddler husband's return.

Naejangsa Temple: first erected in 636, but most of its current buildings were built after the Japanese invasions of Korea in 1597 and the Korean War. On 31 October 2012, the temple was destroyed in a fire that broke out.

Festivals
A maple festival around Naejang-san is held annually. The maple leaves here are widely regarded as some of the most beautiful in the country. The festival was abolished in 2002 but was revived in 2007. This festival includes several events regarding the chrysanthemum love.

Additionally, a century ago, Jeongeup was the site of a revolution by the religious movement of Cheondoism. A lot of peasants joined the movement against the Japanese invaders. For this, Jeongeup holds an annual ceremony to commemorate the event.

Notable people
 Seung Hwan Oh, professional baseball player, Olympic gold medalist
 Song Dae-kwan, singer
 Yu Sung-yup, politician

Twin towns – sister cities

Jeongeup is twinned with:
  Jongno-gu, Seoul
  Sacheon, South Gyeongsang
  Sokcho, Gangwon
  Suseong-gu, Daegu
  Xuzhou, Jiangsu, China
  Narita, Chiba, Japan

Climate
Jeongeup has a cooler version of a humid subtropical climate (Köppen climate classification Cfa).

Gallery

See also
 Naejang-san
 List of cities in South Korea

References

External links

 Jeongeup city official homepage

 
Cities in North Jeolla Province